Arsen Nagimovich Khisamutdinov (born 26 February 1998) is a Russian professional ice hockey forward currently under contract with Avtomobilist Yekaterinburg in the Kontinental Hockey League (KHL). He was selected 170th overall by the Canadiens in the 2019 NHL Entry Draft.

Playing career
Khisamutdinov made his professional debut in his native Russia with original club, HC Neftekhimik Nizhnekamsk, of the Kontinental Hockey League. On 1 May 2020, he was signed to a two-year, entry-level contract with draft club, the Montreal Canadiens.

In the  season, Khisamutdinov was assigned by the Canadiens to begin the year with secondary affiliate, the Trois-Rivières Lions in the ECHL. Collecting 5 points through 10 games, on December 9, 2021, Khisamutdinov was placed on unconditional waivers by the Canadiens for the purposes of contract termination. Having cleared waivers on December 10, 2021, the player's contract was terminated as mutually agreed.

On December 18, 2021, Khisamutdinov reached a one-year agreement to return to the KHL, joining Latvian based club Dinamo Riga. He registered 1 assist through just 5 games in his tenure with Riga.

With Dinamo Riga's withdrawal from the KHL due to the Russian invasion of Ukraine, Khisamutdinov continued in the KHL in securing a one-year contract with Avtomobilist Yekaterinburg on 5 May 2022.

Career statistics

Awards and honours

References

External links
 

1998 births
Living people
Avtomobilist Yekaterinburg players
Dinamo Riga players
Laval Rocket players
Montreal Canadiens draft picks
HC Neftekhimik Nizhnekamsk players
Russian ice hockey left wingers
Trois-Rivières Lions players
Sportspeople from Ufa